Altona Roosters Rugby League Club is an Australian rugby league football club based in West Melbourne formed in the late 1980s. They conduct teams for both junior and senior teams. The club has also produced a number of juniors for the Melbourne Storm SG Ball, National Youth Competition and National Rugby League.

Notable Juniors
Following are player that went on to play professional first grade rugby league.
Jeremy Smith (2004-16 Melbourne Storm, St George, Cronulla and Newcastle)
Gareth Widdop (2010- Melbourne Storm, St George & Warrington)
Drury Low (2010-14 Canberra Raiders, Canterbury)
Charnze Nicoll-Klokstad (2017- New Zealand Warriors & Canberra Raiders)
Ben Nakubuwai (2017-19 Gold Coast Titans & Salford Red Devils)
Zev John (2019 Papua New Guinea Kumuls)
Jamayne Taunoa-Brown (2020- New Zealand Warriors)

Other Juniors
Dane Chang (2012-13 Melbourne Storm U20)
Aleki Falepaini (2012-13 Melbourne Storm U20)
Kurt Bernard (2014 Melbourne Storm U20)
Tony Tumusa (2014-15 Melbourne Storm U20)
Jamayne Taunoa-Brown (2014-15 Melbourne Storm U20)
Shae Ah-Fook (2014-15 Melbourne Storm U20)
Paula Fifita (2015 Melbourne Storm U20)
Melvin Fifita (2015 Melbourne Storm U20)
Luteru Leota (2015 Melbourne Storm U20)
Amanaki Manu (2015-16 Melbourne Storm U20 & Parramatta Eels U20)
Kelepi Manu (2015-16 Melbourne Storm U20 & Parramatta Eels U20)
Pio Nakubuwai Jnr (2017 Melbourne Storm U20)

See also

Rugby league in Victoria

References

External links
 

Rugby league clubs in Melbourne
Rugby clubs established in 1987
1987 establishments in Australia
Sport in the City of Hobsons Bay